The 1886 Pittsburgh Alleghenys season was the 5th season of the Pittsburgh Alleghenys franchise. The Alleghenys finished second in the American Association with a record of 80–57.

Regular season

Season standings

Record vs. opponents

Game log 

|- style="background:#fbb;"
| 1 || Sunday, Apr 18 || @ St. Louis Browns || 4–8 || 0–1
|- style="background:#fbb;"
| 2 || Sunday, Apr 18 || @ St. Louis Browns || 5–10 || 0–2
|- style="background:#cfc;"
| 3 || Monday, Apr 19 || @ St. Louis Browns || 6–5 || 1–2
|- style="background:#fbb;"
| 4 || Tuesday, Apr 20 || @ St. Louis Browns || 10–11 || 1–3
|- style="background:#cfc;"
| 5 || Wednesday, Apr 21 || @ Cincinnati Red Stockings || 13–7 || 2–3
|- style="background:#fbb;"
| 6 || Thursday, Apr 22 || @ Cincinnati Red Stockings || 8–9 || 2–4
|- style="background:#fbb;"
| 7 || Friday, Apr 23 || @ Cincinnati Red Stockings || 7–13 || 2–5
|- style="background:#fbb;"
| 8 || Saturday, Apr 24 || @ Cincinnati Red Stockings || 10–14 || 2–6
|- style="background:#cfc;"
| 9 || Monday, Apr 26 || @ Louisville Colonels || 8–3 || 3–6
|- style="background:#cfc;"
| 10 || Tuesday, Apr 27 || @ Louisville Colonels || 8–3 || 4–6
|- style="background:#fbb;"
| 11 || Wednesday, Apr 28 || @ Louisville Colonels || 1–2 || 4–7
|-

|- style="background:#fbb;"
| 12 || Saturday, May 1 || St. Louis Browns || 4–5 || 4–8
|- style="background:#cfc;"
| 13 || Monday, May 3 || St. Louis Browns || 7–6 || 5–8
|- style="background:#fbb;"
| 14 || Tuesday, May 4 || St. Louis Browns || 7–14 || 5–9
|- style="background:#cfc;"
| 15 || Thursday, May 6 || St. Louis Browns || 6–0 || 6–9
|- style="background:#cfc;"
| 16 || Saturday, May 8 || Cincinnati Red Stockings || 9–6 || 7–9
|- style="background:#fbb;"
| 17 || Monday, May 10 || Cincinnati Red Stockings || 2–4 || 7–10
|- style="background:#cfc;"
| 18 || Tuesday, May 11 || Cincinnati Red Stockings || 9–7 || 8–10
|- style="background:#cfc;"
| 19 || Wednesday, May 12 || Cincinnati Red Stockings || 9–7 || 9–10
|- style="background:#cfc;"
| 20 || Thursday, May 13 || Louisville Colonels || 4–2 || 10–10
|- style="background:#fbb;"
| 21 || Friday, May 14 || Louisville Colonels || 1–4 || 10–11
|- style="background:#fbb;"
| 22 || Saturday, May 15 || Louisville Colonels || 2–6 || 10–12
|- style="background:#cfc;"
| 23 || Monday, May 17 || Louisville Colonels || 5–3 || 11–12
|- style="background:#fbb;"
| 24 || Tuesday, May 18 || @ New York Metropolitans || 4–14 || 11–13
|- style="background:#cfc;"
| 25 || Wednesday, May 19 || @ New York Metropolitans || 6–4 || 12–13
|- style="background:#cfc;"
| 26 || Thursday, May 20 || @ Brooklyn Grays || 1–0 || 13–13
|- style="background:#cfc;"
| 27 || Friday, May 21 || @ Brooklyn Grays || 6–4 || 14–13
|- style="background:#cfc;"
| 28 || Saturday, May 22 || @ New York Metropolitans || 5–4 || 15–13
|- style="background:#cfc;"
| 29 || Tuesday, May 25 || @ Brooklyn Grays || 6–4 || 16–13
|- style="background:#fbb;"
| 30 || Wednesday, May 26 || @ Brooklyn Grays || 3–7 || 16–14
|- style="background:#cfc;"
| 31 || Thursday, May 27 || @ Baltimore Orioles || 6–5 || 17–14
|- style="background:#fbb;"
| 32 || Friday, May 28 || @ Baltimore Orioles || 1–4 || 17–15
|- style="background:#cfc;"
| 33 || Saturday, May 29 || Baltimore Orioles || 15–5 || 18–15
|- style="background:#cfc;"
| 34 || Saturday, May 29 || Baltimore Orioles || 4–0 || 19–15
|-

|- style="background:#fbb;"
| 35 || Tuesday, Jun 1 || @ Philadelphia Athletics || 6–16 || 19–16
|- style="background:#cfc;"
| 36 || Wednesday, Jun 2 || @ Philadelphia Athletics || 6–1 || 20–16
|- style="background:#fbb;"
| 37 || Thursday, Jun 3 || @ Philadelphia Athletics || 5–12 || 20–17
|- style="background:#cfc;"
| 38 || Friday, Jun 4 || @ Philadelphia Athletics || 16–8 || 21–17
|- style="background:#cfc;"
| 39 || Saturday, Jun 5 || Cincinnati Red Stockings || 3–1 || 22–17
|- style="background:#cfc;"
| 40 || Monday, Jun 7 || Cincinnati Red Stockings || 3–0 || 23–17
|- style="background:#fbb;"
| 41 || Tuesday, Jun 8 || Cincinnati Red Stockings || 9–10 || 23–18
|- style="background:#cfc;"
| 42 || Thursday, Jun 10 || @ Cincinnati Red Stockings || 5–1 || 24–18
|- style="background:#fbb;"
| 43 || Friday, Jun 11 || @ Cincinnati Red Stockings || 3–5 || 24–19
|- style="background:#cfc;"
| 44 || Saturday, Jun 12 || @ Cincinnati Red Stockings || 6–5 || 25–19
|- style="background:#fbb;"
| 45 || Sunday, Jun 13 || @ St. Louis Browns || 0–2 || 25–20
|- style="background:#fbb;"
| 46 || Wednesday, Jun 16 || @ St. Louis Browns || 0–1 || 25–21
|- style="background:#fbb;"
| 47 || Friday, Jun 18 || Louisville Colonels || 4–9 || 25–22
|- style="background:#fbb;"
| 48 || Saturday, Jun 19 || Louisville Colonels || 2–3 || 25–23
|- style="background:#cfc;"
| 49 || Monday, Jun 21 || Louisville Colonels || 8–2 || 26–23
|- style="background:#cfc;"
| 50 || Wednesday, Jun 23 || St. Louis Browns || 3–0 || 27–23
|- style="background:#fbb;"
| 51 || Thursday, Jun 24 || St. Louis Browns || 1–2 || 27–24
|- style="background:#fbb;"
| 52 || Friday, Jun 25 || @ Louisville Colonels || 5–19 || 27–25
|- style="background:#cfc;"
| 53 || Saturday, Jun 26 || @ Louisville Colonels || 4–3 || 28–25
|- style="background:#cfc;"
| 54 || Monday, Jun 28 || Philadelphia Athletics || 9–1 || 29–25
|- style="background:#cfc;"
| 55 || Tuesday, Jun 29 || Philadelphia Athletics || 7–2 || 30–25
|- style="background:#cfc;"
| 56 || Wednesday, Jun 30 || Philadelphia Athletics || 12–3 || 31–25
|-

|- style="background:#fbb;"
| 57 || Thursday, Jul 1 || Philadelphia Athletics || 4–5 || 31–26
|- style="background:#cfc;"
| 58 || Friday, Jul 2 || Baltimore Orioles || 6–0 || 32–26
|- style="background:#fbb;"
| 59 || Saturday, Jul 3 || Baltimore Orioles || 3–12 || 32–27
|- style="background:#cfc;"
| 60 || Monday, Jul 5 || Baltimore Orioles || 15–1 || 33–27
|- style="background:#cfc;"
| 61 || Monday, Jul 5 || Baltimore Orioles || 13–2 || 34–27
|- style="background:#cfc;"
| 62 || Wednesday, Jul 7 || Brooklyn Grays || 6–2 || 35–27
|- style="background:#cfc;"
| 63 || Thursday, Jul 8 || Brooklyn Grays || 8–1 || 36–27
|- style="background:#fbb;"
| 64 || Friday, Jul 9 || Brooklyn Grays || 0–4 || 36–28
|- style="background:#fbb;"
| 65 || Saturday, Jul 10 || Brooklyn Grays || 4–5 || 36–29
|- style="background:#fbb;"
| 66 || Monday, Jul 12 || New York Metropolitans || 2–4 || 36–30
|- style="background:#cfc;"
| 67 || Tuesday, Jul 13 || New York Metropolitans || 9–3 || 37–30
|- style="background:#cfc;"
| 68 || Wednesday, Jul 14 || New York Metropolitans || 4–1 || 38–30
|- style="background:#cfc;"
| 69 || Thursday, Jul 15 || New York Metropolitans || 5–3 || 39–30
|- style="background:#cfc;"
| 70 || Saturday, Jul 17 || @ Baltimore Orioles || 7–6 || 40–30
|- style="background:#cfc;"
| 71 || Monday, Jul 19 || @ Baltimore Orioles || 5–4 || 41–30
|- style="background:#fbb;"
| 72 || Tuesday, Jul 20 || @ Baltimore Orioles || 2–5 || 41–31
|- style="background:#fbb;"
| 73 || Wednesday, Jul 21 || @ Baltimore Orioles || 1–6 || 41–32
|- style="background:#fbb;"
| 74 || Thursday, Jul 22 || @ Philadelphia Athletics || 4–7 || 41–33
|- style="background:#cfc;"
| 75 || Friday, Jul 23 || @ Philadelphia Athletics || 17–6 || 42–33
|- style="background:#fbb;"
| 76 || Saturday, Jul 24 || @ Philadelphia Athletics || 6–7 || 42–34
|- style="background:#fbb;"
| 77 || Sunday, Jul 25 || @ Brooklyn Grays || 3–6 || 42–35
|- style="background:#fbb;"
| 78 || Tuesday, Jul 27 || @ New York Metropolitans || 1–8 || 42–36
|- style="background:#fbb;"
| 79 || Wednesday, Jul 28 || @ Brooklyn Grays || 6–10 || 42–37
|- style="background:#cfc;"
| 80 || Thursday, Jul 29 || @ New York Metropolitans || 11–2 || 43–37
|- style="background:#fbb;"
| 81 || Saturday, Jul 31 || @ New York Metropolitans || 6–7 || 43–38
|-

|- style="background:#cfc;"
| 82 || Sunday, Aug 1 || @ Brooklyn Grays || 10–9 || 44–38
|- style="background:#cfc;"
| 83 || Tuesday, Aug 3 || Brooklyn Grays || 18–0 || 45–38
|- style="background:#cfc;"
| 84 || Wednesday, Aug 4 || Brooklyn Grays || 5–3 || 46–38
|- style="background:#fbb;"
| 85 || Thursday, Aug 5 || Brooklyn Grays || 3–4 || 46–39
|- style="background:#fbb;"
| 86 || Friday, Aug 6 || Baltimore Orioles || 1–3 || 46–40
|- style="background:#cfc;"
| 87 || Saturday, Aug 7 || Baltimore Orioles || 11–2 || 47–40
|- style="background:#cfc;"
| 88 || Monday, Aug 9 || Baltimore Orioles || 7–2 || 48–40
|- style="background:#cfc;"
| 89 || Tuesday, Aug 10 || Philadelphia Athletics || 14–7 || 49–40
|- style="background:#fbb;"
| 90 || Wednesday, Aug 11 || Philadelphia Athletics || 2–3 || 49–41
|- style="background:#cfc;"
| 91 || Thursday, Aug 12 || Philadelphia Athletics || 7–4 || 50–41
|- style="background:#cfc;"
| 92 || Monday, Aug 16 || New York Metropolitans || 1–0 || 51–41
|- style="background:#fbb;"
| 93 || Tuesday, Aug 17 || New York Metropolitans || 5–7 || 51–42
|- style="background:#fbb;"
| 94 || Wednesday, Aug 18 || New York Metropolitans || 0–2 || 51–43
|- style="background:#cfc;"
| 95 || Thursday, Aug 19 || @ St. Louis Browns || 6–0 || 52–43
|- style="background:#cfc;"
| 96 || Friday, Aug 20 || @ St. Louis Browns || 3–0 || 53–43
|- style="background:#fbb;"
| 97 || Saturday, Aug 21 || @ St. Louis Browns || 3–7 || 53–44
|- style="background:#cfc;"
| 98 || Sunday, Aug 22 || @ St. Louis Browns || 6–4 || 54–44
|- style="background:#cfc;"
| 99 || Monday, Aug 23 || @ Louisville Colonels || 6–3 || 55–44
|- style="background:#cfc;"
| 100 || Tuesday, Aug 24 || @ Louisville Colonels || 7–3 || 56–44
|- style="background:#cfc;"
| 101 || Wednesday, Aug 25 || @ Louisville Colonels || 7–2 || 57–44
|- style="background:#cfc;"
| 102 || Thursday, Aug 26 || @ Louisville Colonels || 7–0 || 58–44
|- style="background:#cfc;"
| 103 || Friday, Aug 27 || @ Cincinnati Red Stockings || 11–8 || 59–44
|- style="background:#cfc;"
| 104 || Saturday, Aug 28 || @ Cincinnati Red Stockings || 10–2 || 60–44
|- style="background:#cfc;"
| 105 || Sunday, Aug 29 || @ Cincinnati Red Stockings || 11–9 || 61–44
|- style="background:#cfc;"
| 106 || Tuesday, Aug 31 || Louisville Colonels || 7–5 || 62–44
|-

|- style="background:#fbb;"
| 107 || Wednesday, Sep 1 || Louisville Colonels || 1–5 || 62–45
|- style="background:#cfc;"
| 108 || Thursday, Sep 2 || Louisville Colonels || 6–2 || 63–45
|- style="background:#fbb;"
| 109 || Friday, Sep 3 || Cincinnati Red Stockings || 3–5 || 63–46
|- style="background:#cfc;"
| 110 || Saturday, Sep 4 || Cincinnati Red Stockings || 1–0 || 64–46
|- style="background:#cfc;"
| 111 || Monday, Sep 6 || Cincinnati Red Stockings || 13–4 || 65–46
|- style="background:#fbb;"
| 112 || Tuesday, Sep 7 || St. Louis Browns || 1–2 || 65–47
|- style="background:#fbb;"
| 113 || Wednesday, Sep 8 || St. Louis Browns || 4–8 || 65–48
|- style="background:#fbb;"
| 114 || Wednesday, Sep 8 || St. Louis Browns || 2–6 || 65–49
|- style="background:#cfc;"
| 115 || Thursday, Sep 9 || St. Louis Browns || 4–3 || 66–49
|- style="background:#cfc;"
| 116 || Friday, Sep 10 || @ Philadelphia Athletics || 4–3 || 67–49
|- style="background:#fbb;"
| 117 || Saturday, Sep 11 || @ Philadelphia Athletics || 10–18 || 67–50
|- style="background:#ffc;"
|  118 || Monday, Sep 13 || @ Philadelphia Athletics || 7–7 || 67–50
|- style="background:#ffc;"
|  119 || Tuesday, Sep 14 || @ Baltimore Orioles || 3–3 || 67–50
|- style="background:#cfc;"
| 120 || Thursday, Sep 16 || @ Baltimore Orioles || 6–0 || 68–50
|- style="background:#fbb;"
| 121 || Friday, Sep 17 || @ New York Metropolitans || 4–7 || 68–51
|- style="background:#cfc;"
| 122 || Saturday, Sep 18 || @ Brooklyn Grays || 7–4 || 69–51
|- style="background:#fbb;"
| 123 || Monday, Sep 20 || @ New York Metropolitans || 5–7 || 69–52
|- style="background:#fbb;"
| 124 || Tuesday, Sep 21 || @ Brooklyn Grays || 7–10 || 69–53
|- style="background:#cfc;"
| 125 || Wednesday, Sep 22 || @ New York Metropolitans || 7–0 || 70–53
|- style="background:#cfc;"
| 126 || Thursday, Sep 23 || @ Brooklyn Grays || 8–2 || 71–53
|- style="background:#cfc;"
| 127 || Saturday, Sep 25 || Philadelphia Athletics || 5–1 || 72–53
|- style="background:#cfc;"
| 128 || Monday, Sep 27 || Philadelphia Athletics || 5–1 || 73–53
|- style="background:#fbb;"
| 129 || Wednesday, Sep 29 || Philadelphia Athletics || 3–6 || 73–54
|- style="background:#cfc;"
| 130 || Thursday, Sep 30 || Brooklyn Grays || 12–0 || 74–54
|-

|- style="background:#cfc;"
| 131 || Friday, Oct 1 || Brooklyn Grays || 7–2 || 75–54
|- style="background:#fbb;"
| 132 || Saturday, Oct 2 || Brooklyn Grays || 4–6 || 75–55
|- style="background:#fbb;"
| 133 || Tuesday, Oct 5 || Baltimore Orioles || 3–6 || 75–56
|- style="background:#ffc;"
|  134 || Tuesday, Oct 5 || Baltimore Orioles || 3–3 || 75–56
|- style="background:#fbb;"
| 135 || Wednesday, Oct 6 || Baltimore Orioles || 0–6 || 75–57
|- style="background:#cfc;"
| 136 || Thursday, Oct 7 || Baltimore Orioles || 7–1 || 76–57
|- style="background:#cfc;"
| 137 || Friday, Oct 8 || New York Metropolitans || 9–0 || 77–57
|- style="background:#cfc;"
| 138 || Saturday, Oct 9 || New York Metropolitans || 4–2 || 78–57
|- style="background:#cfc;"
| 139 || Monday, Oct 11 || New York Metropolitans || 4–1 || 79–57
|- style="background:#cfc;"
| 140 || Tuesday, Oct 12 || New York Metropolitans || 7–2 || 80–57
|-

|- style="text-align:center;"
| Legend:       = Win       = Loss       = Tie

 Roster 

 Player stats 
BattersNote: G = Games played; AB = At bats; H = Hits; Avg. = Batting average; HR = Home runs; RBI = Runs batted in 

PitchersNote: G = Games pitched; IP = Innings pitched; W = Wins; L = Losses; ERA = Earned run average; SO = Strikeouts''

Notable transactions 
 April 1886: Milt Scott was assigned by the Alleghenys to the Baltimore Orioles.

References 

Pittsburgh Pirates seasons
Pittsburgh Alleghenys season
Pittsburg Pir